Pachycordyle is a genus of cnidarians belonging to the family Bougainvilliidae.

The species of this genus are found in Europe, Southeastern Asia and Northern America.

Species:

Pachycordyle conica 
Pachycordyle degenerata 
Pachycordyle globulosa 
Pachycordyle kubotai 
Pachycordyle lineata 
Pachycordyle mashikoi 
Pachycordyle michaeli 
Pachycordyle napolitana 
Pachycordyle pusilla

References

Bougainvilliidae
Hydrozoan genera